The tennis competition at the 2006 Central American and Caribbean Games was held in Cartagena, Colombia.

Medal summary

Men's events

Women's events

Mixed event

References

Central American and Caribbean Games
2006 Central American and Caribbean Games
2006